Dongkou County is a county in the Province of Hunan, China, it is under the administration of Shaoyang City. Located in west-central Hunan, the county is bordered to the northeast by Longhui County, to the northwest by Xupu County and Hongjiang City, to the southwest by Suining County, to the southeast by Xinning County. The county has 11 towns, nine townships and three subdistricts under its jurisdiction, the county seat is Wenchang Subdistrict.

Administrative divisions
3 subdistricts
 Huagu
 Wenchang
 Xuefeng

11 towns
 Gaosha
 Huayuan
 Huangqiao
 Jiangkou
 Liaotian
 Shanmen
 Shijiang
 Shuidong
 Yanqian
 Yulan
 Zhushi

6 townships
 Gulou
 Shizhu
 Tongshan
 Yanglin
 Yuexi
 Zhaping

3 Yao ethnic townships
 Changtang
 Dawu
 Luoxi

Climate

References

Transportation
Dongkou railway station on the Huaihua–Shaoyang–Hengyang railway is located here.

External links

 
County-level divisions of Hunan
Shaoyang